Gherardo Gherardi (1891–1949) was an Italian screenwriter. He co-wrote the screenplay for Vittorio De Sica's 1948 neorealist classic Bicycle Thieves. Originally a playwright, he worked prolifically in the Italian film industry following its rapid expansion during the late Fascist era.

Selected filmography

 The Countess of Parma (1936)
 Music in the Square (1936)
 The Two Sergeants (1936)
 Adam's Tree (1936)
 These Children (1937)
 Doctor Antonio (1937)
 The Three Wishes (1937)
 Triumph of Love (1938)
 Departure (1938)
 It Always Ends That Way (1939)
 The Knight of San Marco (1939)
 A Thousand Lire a Month (1939)
 The Sons of the Marquis Lucera (1939)
 Red Tavern (1940)
 Caravaggio, il pittore maledetto (1941)
 Blood Wedding (1941)
 The Secret Lover (1941)
 A Pilot Returns (1942)
 The Queen of Navarre (1942)
 Giarabub (1942)
 Luisa Sanfelice (1942)
 Odessa in Flames (1942)
 C'è sempre un ma! (1942)
 Signorinette (1942)
 The Taming of the Shrew (1942)
 The Children Are Watching Us (1943)
 Farewell Love! (1943)
 Mist on the Sea (1944)
 L'abito nero da sposa (1945)
 The Song of Life (1945)
 Before Him All Rome Trembled (1946)
 Fire Over the Sea (1947)
 Bicycle Thieves (1948)
 Eleven Men and a Ball (1948)
 Buried Alive (1949)

References

Bibliography
 Landy, Marcia. Fascism in Film: The Italian Commercial Cinema, 1931-1943. Princeton University Press, 2014.

External links

1891 births
1949 deaths
20th-century Italian screenwriters
Film people from Bologna